The legislative districts of Cagayan are the representations of the province of Cagayan in the various national legislatures of the Philippines. The province is currently represented in the lower house of the Congress of the Philippines through its first, second, and third congressional districts.

History 
Cagayan, which included the sub-province of Batanes, was initially divided into two representative districts in 1907. Batanes was last represented as part of the province's first district in 1909, after its re-establishment as a province by virtue of Act No. 1952 enacted on May 20, 1909 warranted its separate representation. A minor adjustment of district boundaries, mandated by Act No. 3032 enacted on March 19, 1922, took effect starting in the 1922 elections.

When seats for the upper house of the Philippine Legislature were elected from territory-based districts between 1916 and 1935, Cagayan formed part of the first senatorial district which elected two out of the 24-member senate. However, residents of two towns that had been annexed from Mountain Province — Allacapan (1928) and Langangan (1922) — were not extended the right to vote in assembly or senatorial elections until 1935, after the passage of Act No. 4203 placed them in the second district of Cagayan.

By virtue of Executive Order No. 84 issued by Philippine Executive Commission Chairman Jorge Vargas on August 31, 1942, the province of Batanes was abolished and its territory was placed under Cagayan's jurisdiction for the duration of the Second World War. Two delegates represented the province in the National Assembly of the Japanese-sponsored Second Philippine Republic: one was the provincial governor (an ex officio member), while the other was elected through a provincial assembly of KALIBAPI members during the Japanese occupation of the Philippines. Upon the restoration of the Philippine Commonwealth in 1945, the province retained its two pre-war representative districts, and Batanes was once again represented separately.

The province was represented in the Interim Batasang Pambansa as part of Region II from 1978 to 1984, and elected two representatives, at large, to the Regular Batasang Pambansa in 1984. Cagayan was reapportioned into three congressional districts under the new Constitution which was proclaimed on February 11, 1987, and elected members to the restored House of Representatives starting that same year.

1st District 

Municipalities: Alcala, Aparri, Baggao, Buguey, Camalaniugan, Gattaran, Gonzaga, Lal-lo, Santa Ana, Santa Teresita
Population (2020): 459,819

1907–1909 
Municipalities: Alcala, Amulung, Aparri, Baggao, Basco, Calayan, Camalaniugan, Gattaran, Iguig, Lal-lo, Peñablanca, Tuguegarao

1909–1922 
Municipalities: Alcala, Amulung, Aparri, Baggao, Calayan (annexed to Aparri from 1912 to 1920), Camalaniugan, Gattaran, Iguig, Lal-lo, Peñablanca, Tuguegarao, Ballesteros (established 1911), Gonzaga (established 1917)

1922–1972 
Municipalities: Alcala, Amulung, Aparri, Baggao, Calayan, Camalaniugan, Gattaran, Gonzaga, Iguig, Lal-lo, Peñablanca, Tuguegarao, Santa Ana (established 1949), Santa Teresita (established 1963)

2nd District 

Municipalities: Abulug, Allacapan, Ballesteros, Calayan, Claveria, Lasam, Pamplona, Piat, Rizal, Sanchez-Mira, Santa Praxedes, Santo Niño
Population (2020): 322,634

Notes

1907–1922 
Municipalities: Abulug, Claveria, Enrile, Faire, Mauanan, Pamplona, Piat, Sanchez-Mira, Solana, Tuao

1922–1935 
Municipalities: Abulug, Ballesteros, Claveria, Enrile, Santo Niño (Faire), Rizal (Mauanan), Pamplona, Piat, Sanchez-Mira, Solana, Tuao

1935–1972 
Municipalities: Abulug, Ballesteros, Claveria, Enrile, Santo Niño (Faire), Rizal (Mauanan), Pamplona, Piat, Sanchez-Mira, Solana, Tuao, Santa Praxedes (Langangan) (annexed from Mountain Province 1922; only voted starting 1935), Allacapan (annexed from Mountain Province 1928; only voted starting 1935), Lasam (established 1950)

3rd District 
City: Tuguegarao (became city 1999)
Municipalities: Amulung, Enrile, Iguig, Peñablanca, Solana, Tuao
Population (2020): 486,150

Notes

At-Large (defunct)

1943–1944 
 includes the sub-province of Batanes

1984–1986

See also 
Legislative district of Batanes
Legislative district of Mountain Province

References 

Cagayan
Politics of Cagayan